The 2018 season was Malmö FF's 107th in existence, their 83rd season in Allsvenskan and their 18th consecutive season in the league. They competed in Allsvenskan where they finished third, 2017–18 Svenska Cupen where they finished as runners-up, and the 2018–19 UEFA Champions League where they were knocked out in the third qualifying round. Malmö FF also participated in two competitions in which the club continued playing in for the 2019 season, the 2018–19 Svenska Cupen and the 2018–19 UEFA Europa League. The season began with the group stage of Svenska Cupen on 18 February, league play started on 2 April and concluded on 11 November. The season concluded with the last UEFA Europa League group stage match on 13 December.

The club's chairman, Håkan Jeppsson, died unexpectedly on 7 December, a week before the last match of the season. Malmö FF won five Swedish championships and participated in two UEFA Champions League group stages, as well as two UEFA Europa League group stages, under his reign. For the first time in the history of the club, Malmö FF managed to qualify for the knock-out stages of the UEFA Europa League. It was also the first time, and third time in total, since the 1986–87 European Cup Winners' Cup that the club qualified for European knock-out matches after the new year. On the domestic stage, Malmö FF ended the season in third place, having had a difficult start to the league season.

Players

Squad

Players in/out

In

Out

Player statistics

Appearances and goals

Competitions

Allsvenskan

After losing several key players during the off-season, many of whom to free transfers, Malmö FF went into the 2018 season with the expressed strategy of only partially replacing the players who were lost with new signings such as Fouad Bachirou, Arnór Ingvi Traustason and Søren Rieks, and filling the depth of the squad with players from the club's academy.

After an unbeaten pre-season and cup run Malmö FF started their season away to IF Elfsborg on 2 April. Teenage starlet Mattias Svanberg opened the club's season tally less than two minutes into the opener in a game Malmö FF ended up winning 2–1. A week later, MFF played their home opener against AIK, who were widely considered MFF's biggest challenger for the title. Despite conceding a penalty and a red card to Franz Brorsson, MFF were able to secure a point with AIK seemingly unwilling to take initiative in front of the sell-out crowd at Stadion.

Despite encouraging signs early in the season, the AIK match turned out to be the start of a historically bad run for Malmö FF, where they won only two of ten matches between 9 April and 16 May, including an embarrassing 3–0 loss in the final of the Swedish Cup. With the title seemingly out of reach only weeks into the season, Magnus Pehrsson was fired after the 1–0 loss to Trelleborgs FF on 13 May. With the club currently in eleventh place, Malmö FF CEO Niclas Carlnén expressibly revised the club's Allsvenskan target from winning the title to reaching a spot in the top three. Sporting director and former club captain Daniel Andersson stepped in as caretaker manager for the three games that remained before the World Cup break, but was unable to right the ship as the team took four points from those three games.

On 12 June Uwe Rösler was appointed head coach, while Andersson also announced several signings in an effort to move up the table and make a run for the upcoming Champions League qualifiers. The 2017 Allsvenskan MVP Anders Christiansen was reacquired from Gent, former club captain Guillermo Molins was brought in on a free transfer, former Allsvenskan top scorer Marcus Antonsson moved from Leeds, and Sundsvall's breakthrough player Romain Gall was added to the squad.

The changes proved effective and Malmö FF emerged as a new team for the second half of the season, with nine wins and one draw over the first ten Allsvenskan games after the World Cup break. A hectic schedule saw MFF eventually get into a five-game slump in which they only won one game, but the team was able to bounce back and finish league play with three straight wins to reach third place and secure a qualifying spot for the 2019–20 UEFA Europa League.

League table

Results summary

Results by round

Matches

Svenska Cupen

2017–18
The tournament continued from the 2017 season.

After beating FC Trollhättan in August 2017 to qualify for the group stage, Malmö FF was drawn into a group with Allsvenskan newcomers IF Brommapojkarna and Dalkurd FF and Superettan side Gefle IF. A late Markus Rosenberg penalty saw Malmö FF win their first game against Dalkurd. In the second contest Malmö FF traveled to Gefle for a game that was postponed four hours because of a snow storm, but when eventually played MFF won comfortably by a score of 3-0. The result set up a group final between two teams that won their first games, where Malmö FF managed to beat Brommapojkarna 3-1 to qualify for the quarter-final in which they beat rivals IFK Göteborg 1-0. In the semi-final the team traveled to Östersund where a late winner from Arnór Traustason sent Malmö FF to the cup final.

The location for the cup final was decided by a draw that took place at an Allsvenskan kick-off event, which awarded home field advantage to Djurgårdens IF. While the competition to this point had been played during the Allsvenskan pre-season, the final was scheduled for 10 May. During the two months that elapsed between the semi-final and final Malmö FF's Allsvenskan campaign had sent the club into a state of crisis, which reached new heights in the cup final where a lackluster performance handed the club a 3-0 defeat which fueled supporter turmoil in the MFF sections with play temporarily suspended in the final minutes.

Kickoff times are in UTC+1 unless stated otherwise.

Group stage

Knockout stage

2018–19
The tournament continued into the 2019 season.

Malmö FF entered the cup in the second round, where they were drawn against Division 1 club Lunds BK. The game was initially scheduled to be played on 23 August, but was postponed because of Malmö FF's Europa League schedule and eventually rescheduled for 22 November.

Qualification stage

UEFA Champions League

Qualifying phase and play-off round

Kickoff times are in UTC+2 unless stated otherwise.
After changes to the UEFA Champions League qualifying phase, Malmö FF entered in the first round for the first time in 2018. Malmö FF were seeded in the first round, and were drawn against the winners of a preliminary tournament involving the champions of the four lowest ranked associations. The winners ended up being Kosovan champions FC Drita. Since Drita's home stadium did not live up to the standards set by UEFA, the game was played at Adem Jashari Olympic Stadium in Mitrovica, and Malmö FF came away with a decisive 3-0 victory which was followed by 2-0 at home to advance to the second round.

In the second round Malmö FF were once again seeded, but faced a tough draw in Romanian champions CFR Cluj. The first game was played in Cluj-Napoca where Carlos Strandberg scored a crucial away goal in the final minute of the first half which ended up being the only goal of the game. Cluj equalized on aggregate 36 minutes into the return leg in Malmö, but a second half long distance strike from Arnór Traustason sent MFF through to the third round.

The draw for the third round took place before the second round was finalized and the winners between Malmö FF and CFR Cluj were unseeded and drawn against the winners between Bulgarian champions Ludogorets Razgrad and Hungarian champions MOL Vidi FC. Against all odds Vidi ended up knocking out the Bulgarians and traveled to Malmö for the first game in the third round. Recently re-acquired Anders Christiansen opened the scoring an hour into the contest, but Vidi scored an equalizer ten minutes later after a defensive error that would end up as the decisive away goal when the return leg finished scoreless in Hungary.

First qualifying round

Second qualifying round

Third qualifying round

UEFA Europa League
The tournament continued into the 2019 season.

Play-off round 

After being knocked out by MOL Vidi FC in the third round of the Champions league qualifiers, Malmö FF entered the play-off round of the UEFA Europa League where they were seeded and drawn against Danish champions FC Midtjylland. After seemingly being in control of play and with a 2-0 lead an hour into the first game at home, MFF lost control the last half hour and ended up having to travel to Denmark with a tough a 2-2 result. In the return leg however, goals from Marcus Antonsson and Markus Rosenberg sent Malmö FF into the Europa League group stages.

Kickoff times are in UTC+2.

Group stage

Times up to 27 October 2018 (matchdays 1–3) are CEST (UTC+2), thereafter (matchdays 4–6) times are CET (UTC+1).

Non-competitive

Pre-season
Malmö FF kicked of its pre-season with two friendlies at Malmö IP before traveling to Bradenton, Florida for pre-season camp. In Florida, MFF played its final matches before the start of Svenska Cupen against two MLS teams. During the group stage of the cup, Malmö FF scheduled additional friendlies to give players who did not feature heavily in the competition pre-season minutes. The games were played on an artificial practice field near Stadion.

Kickoff times are in UTC+1 unless stated otherwise.

Mid-season
Kickoff times are in UTC+2 unless stated otherwise.

Footnotes

External links

  

Malmö FF
Malmö FF seasons
Malmo